Aurillac – Tronquières Airport  is an airport located  southwest of Aurillac,  a commune of the Cantal département in the Auvergne région of France.

Airlines and destinations 
The following airlines operate regular scheduled and charter flights at Aurillac Airport:

Statistics

References

External links 
Aéroport d'Aurillac – Tronquières at CABA 
Aéroport d'Aurillac at Union des Aéroports Français 

Airports in Auvergne-Rhône-Alpes
Buildings and structures in Cantal